The 2007 Women's National Invitation Tournament (WNIT) was a single-elimination tournament of 48 National Collegiate Athletic Association (NCAA) Division I teams that did not participate in the 2007 NCAA Division I women's basketball tournament.

The teams were deemed the "best of the rest" from the 31 Division I conferences were joined by 17 at-large selections.

The final four of the tournament paired Wisconsin against Western Kentucky and Wyoming against 2006 WNIT champion Kansas State.  Wisconsin (23–12) defeated Western Kentucky 79–72.  Meanwhile, across the country, Wyoming and Kansas State played a triple-overtime thriller.  The Cowgirls eventually pulled out the victory, holding Kansas State to a single point in the third overtime, and winning 89–79.

The championship game of the WNIT was played Saturday, March 31, 2007, in front of 15,462 fans at the Arena-Auditorium in Laramie, Wyoming (the largest crowd in Wyoming Cowgirl History).  Wyoming dominated the game and won 72–56, bringing the Cowgirls their first postseason championship win. They also became the first Mountain West Conference team to win the tournament.

Region 1
Source:

(***) denotes triple overtime

Region 2

Region 3

Region 4

Semifinals and final

(***) denotes triple overtime

References

Women's National Invitation Tournament
Women's National Invitation Tournament
Women's National Invitation Tournament
Women's National Invitation Tournament